The Taste of TG (subtitled A Beginner's Guide to the Music of Throbbing Gristle) is a compilation album by Throbbing Gristle. The cover art is a manipulation by Peter Christopherson of a still from the Pier Paolo Pasolini film Salò o le 120 giornate di Sodoma.

Track listing
"Industrial Introduction" - 1:05
"Distant Dreams (Part Two)" - 5:30
"Persuasion USA" - 7:29
"Something Came Over Me" - 3:43
"Dead on Arrival" - 6:08
"Hot on the Heels of Love" - 4:24
"We Hate You (Little Girls)" - 2:07 
"United" - 4:04
"Cabaret Voltaire" - 3:58
"Exotic Functions" - 4:18
"Zyclon B Zombie" - 3:52
"Walkabout" - 3:04
"Hamburger Lady" - 4:15
"Almost a Kiss" - 6:43
"His Arm Was Her Leg" - 5:40

Tracks 1, 8, 11 from TGCD2 (The Second Annual Report)
Tracks 2, 3, & 4 from TGCD6 (Mission of Dead Souls)
Tracks 5, 7, & 13 from TGCD3 (D.o.A: The Third and Final Report)
Tracks 6 & 12 from TGCD4 (20 Jazz Funk Greats)
Track 9 from TGCD11 (TG Box 1|Throbbing Gristle Live, Volume 2: 1977-1978)
Track 10 from TGCD8 (Journey Through a Body)
Track 14 from TGCD16 (Part Two: The Endless Not) 
Track 15 from TGCD12 (TG Box 1|Throbbing Gristle Live, Volume 3: 1978-1979)

References

2004 compilation albums
Throbbing Gristle compilation albums
Mute Records compilation albums